The 1971 Pittsburgh Pirates season was the 90th season for the Pittsburgh Pirates franchise; their 85th in the National League. It involved the Pirates finishing first in the National League East with a record of 97 wins and 65 losses. They defeated the San Francisco Giants three games to one in the National League Championship Series and beat the Baltimore Orioles four games to three in the World Series. The Pirates were managed by Danny Murtaugh, and played their first full season at Three Rivers Stadium, which had opened in July the year before.

Offseason 
 October 15, 1970: Charlie Sands and 2 minor leaguers were traded to the Pirates by the New York Yankees for 3 minor leaguers.
 October 26, 1970: Joe Gibbon released by the Pirates.
 December 2, 1970: Freddie Patek, Bruce Dal Canton and Jerry May were traded by the Pirates to the Kansas City Royals for Bob Johnson, Jackie Hernández and Jim Campanis.
 January 29, 1971: Matty Alou and George Brunet were traded by the Pirates to the St. Louis Cardinals for Nelson Briles and Vic Davalillo.
 February 10, 1971: Danny Rivas (minors) was traded by the Pirates to the Mexico City Reds for Ramón Hernández.

Regular season 
In 1971, the Pirates became the first Major League Baseball team to field an all-black starting lineup. Taking the field, on September 1, was Rennie Stennett, Gene Clines, Roberto Clemente, Willie Stargell, Manny Sanguillén, Dave Cash, Al Oliver, Jackie Hernández, and Dock Ellis.

Season standings

Record vs. opponents

Detailed records

Game log 

|-style=background:#cfc
| 1 || April 6 || 1:35p.m. EST || Phillies || 4–2 || Ellis (1–0) || Short (0–1) || — || 2:21 || 39,712 || 1–0 || W1
|-style=background:#cfc
| 2 || April 8 || 8:05p.m. EST || Phillies || 2–0 || Walker (1–0) || Fryman (0–1) || — || 1:47 || 12,289 || 2–0 || W2
|-style=background:#cfc
| 3 || April 9 || 8:05p.m. EST || @ Braves || 8–2 || Moose (1–0) || Jarvis (0–1) || Giusti (1) || 2:23 || 32,734 || 3–0 || W3
|-style=background:#fbb
| 4 || April 10 || 8:05p.m. EST || @ Braves || 4–5 (12) || Upshaw (2–0) || Briles (0–1) || — || 2:41 || 13,079 || 3–1 || L1
|-style=background:#fbb
| 5 || April 11 || 2:15p.m. EST || @ Braves || 1–3 || Nash (1–0) || Ellis (1–1) || — || 1:52 || 10,220 || 3–2 || L2
|-style=background:#cfc
| 6 || April 12 || 7:35p.m. EST || @ Phillies || 4–3 (11) || Giusti (1–0) || Selma (0–1) || — || 2:55 || 19,469 || 4–2 || W1
|-style=background:#cfc
| 7 || April 13 || 7:35p.m. EST || @ Phillies || 9–3 || Briles (1–1) || Short (0–2) || — || 2:28 || 14,934 || 5–2 || W2
|-style=background:#fbb
| 8 || April 14 || 7:35p.m. EST || @ Phillies || 5–6 || Hoerner (1–0) || Grant (0–1) || Selma (1) || 2:34 || 8,379 || 5–3 || L1
|-style=background:#fbb
| 9 || April 16 || 2:15p.m. EST || @ Mets || 0–1 || Seaver (2–0) || Ellis (1–2) || — || 2:03 || 18,491 || 5–4 || L2
|-style=background:#cfc
| 10 || April 17 || 2:15p.m. EST || @ Mets || 2–0 || Blass (1–0) || Koosman (0–1) || — || 2:01 || 23,305 || 6–4 || W1
|-style=background:#fbb
| 11  || April 18 || 1:05p.m. EST || @ Mets || 2–5 || Gentry (1–2) || Walker (1–1) || — || 2:09 ||  || 6–5 || L1
|-style=background:#cfc
| 12  || April 18 || 3:49p.m. EST || @ Mets || 2–1 || Johnson (1–0) || McGraw (1–1) || — || 2:43 || 51,905 || 7–5 || W1
|-style=background:#fbb
| 13 || April 20 || 8:05p.m. EST || Braves || 0–2 || Niekro (1–1) || Moose (1–1) || — || 1:58 || 8,755 || 7–6 || L1
|-style=background:#cfc
| 14 || April 21 || 8:05p.m. EST || Braves || 10–2 || Ellis (2–2) || Nash (1–1) || — || 2:06 || 7,992 || 8–6 || W1
|-style=background:#cfc
| 15 || April 22 || 8:05p.m. EST || Braves || 7–4 || Blass (2–0) || Reed (2–2) || Giusti (2) || 2:06 || 4,708 || 9–6 || W2
|-style=background:#fbb
| 16 || April 23 || 8:05p.m. EST || Giants || 0–2 || Stone (1–0) || Walker (1–2) || — || 2:08 || 12,350 || 9–7 || L1
|-style=background:#fbb
| 17 || April 24 || 2:15p.m. EST || Giants || 0–2 || Bryant (2–0) || Johnson (1–1) || — || 2:21 || 8,386 || 9–8 || L2
|-style=background:#cfc
| 18 || April 25 || 1:35p.m. EDT || Giants || 6–2 || Briles (2–1) || Marichal (3–2) || Giusti (3) || 2:51 || 16,553 || 10–8 || W1
|-style=background:#fbb
| 19 || April 27 || || Dodgers || 5–7 || Vance || Ellis (2–3) || Mikkelsen || || 6,518 || 10–9 || L1
|-style=background:#cfc
| 20 || April 28 || || Dodgers || 7–5 || Blass (3–0) || O'Brien || Giusti (4) || || 6,191 || 11–9 || W1
|-style=background:#fbb
| 21 || April 29 || || Dodgers || 1–2 || Mikkelsen || Giusti (1–1) || — || || 5,031 || 11–10 || L1
|-style=background:#cfc
| 22 || April 30 || || Padres || 5–3 || Nelson (1–0) || Kelley || Grant (1) || || 5,944 || 12–10 || W1
|-

|-style=background:#cfc
| 23 || May 1 || || Padres || 5–4 (11) || Grant (1–1) || Laxton || — || || 6,068 || 13–10 || W2
|-style=background:#cfc
| 24 || May 2 || || Padres || 5–1 || Ellis (3–3) || Arlin || Giusti (5) || || 8,482 || 14–10 || W3
|-style=background:#cfc
| 25 || May 4 || 11:00p.m. EDT || @ Giants || 10–2 || Moose (2–1) || Stone (2–1) || Grant (2) || 2:53 || 8,263 || 15–10 || W4
|-style=background:#fbb
| 26 || May 5 || 4:00p.m. EDT || @ Giants || 1–2 || Marichal (4–2) || Walker (1–3) || — || 2:02 || 5,212 || 15–11 || L1
|-style=background:#cfc
| 27 || May 7 || || @ Dodgers || 3–2 || Johnson (2–1) || Sutton || Grant (3) || || 44,275 || 16–11 || W1
|-style=background:#cfc
| 28 || May 8 || || @ Dodgers || 5–3 || Briles (3–1) || Downing || Giusti (6) || || 26,737 || 17–11 || W2
|-style=background:#cfc
| 29 || May 9 || || @ Dodgers || 11–5 || Veale (1–0) || Mikkelsen || Grant (4) || || 26,349 || 18–11 || W3
|-style=background:#cfc
| 30 || May 11 || || @ Padres || 10–4 || Ellis (4–3) || Coombs || Giusti (7) || || 4,440 || 19–11 || W4
|-style=background:#fbb
| 31 || May 12 || || @ Padres || 1–2 || Roberts || Walker (1–4) || — || || 4,292 || 19–12 || L1
|-style=background:#fbb
| 32 || May 14 || 8:05p.m. EDT || Mets || 2–8 || Koosman (3–1) || Johnson (2–2) || — || 2:23 || 17,622 || 19–13 || L2
|-style=background:#fbb
| 33 || May 15 || 8:05p.m. EDT || Mets || 5–9 || Sadecki (1–0) || Blass (3–1) || — || 2:26 || 22,042 || 19–14 || L3
|-style=background:#cfc
| 34 || May 16 || 1:35p.m. EDT || Mets || 4–2 || Ellis (5–3) || Ryan (4–1) || Giusti (8) || 2:11 || 18,968 || 20–14 || W1
|-style=background:#cfc
| 35 || May 17 || || Expos || 6–5 || Grant (2–1) || Marshall || — || || 6,431 || 21–14 || W2
|-style=background:#cfc
| 36 || May 18 || || Expos || 3–2 || Johnson (3–2) || Marshall || — || || 10,226 || 22–14 || W3
|-style=background:#cfc
| 37 || May 19 || || @ Reds || 6–1 || Moose (3–1) || Nolan || Giusti (9) || || 11,109 || 23–14 || W4
|-style=background:#fbb
| 38 || May 20 || || @ Reds || 4–5 || Wilcox || Blass (3–2) || Carroll || || 9,530 || 23–15 || L1
|-style=background:#cfc
| 39 || May 21 || || @ Expos || 6–2 (13) || Grant (3–1) || Reed || — || || 17,379 || 24–15 || W1
|-style=background:#fbb
| 40 || May 22 || || @ Expos || 2–5 || Stoneman || Walker (1–5) || — || || 18,814 || 24–16 || L1
|-style=background:#fbb
| 41 || May 23 || || @ Expos || 2–4 || McAnally || Johnson (3–3) || Marshall || || 27,216 || 24–17 || L2
|-style=background:#fbb
| 42 || May 25 || || Reds || 4–7 || Grimsley || Moose (3–2) || Gibbon || || 8,607 || 24–18 || L3
|-style=background:#cfc
| 43 || May 26 || || Reds || 2–0 || Blass (4–2) || Cloninger || — || || 7,369 || 25–18 || W1
|-style=background:#cfc
| 44 || May 27 || || Reds || 5–2 || Ellis (6–3) || Merritt || — || || 7,408 || 26–18 || W2
|-style=background:#fbb
| 45 || May 28 || || Cubs || 2–4 || Pappas || Walker (1–6) || — || || 12,776 || 26–19 || L1
|-style=background:#cfc
| 46 || May 29 || || Cubs || 9–4 || Johnson (4–3) || Hands || Giusti (10) || || 12,336 || 27–19 || W1
|-style=background:#cfc
| 47 || May 30 || || Cubs || 10–0 || Moose (4–2) || Holtzman || — || || 14,643 || 28–19 || W2
|-style=background:#cfc
| 48 || May 31 || || Cubs || 6–0 || Blass (5–2) || Jenkins || — || || 19,589 || 29–19 || W3
|-

|-style=background:#cfc
| 49 || June 1 || || Cardinals || 9–0 || Ellis (7–3) || Zachary || — || || 21,516 || 30–19 || W4
|-style=background:#cfc
| 50 || June 2 || || Cardinals || 10–1 || Walker (2–6) || Cleveland || Veale (1) || || 9,612 || 31–19 || W5
|-style=background:#fbb
| 51 || June 3 || || Cardinals || 1–7 || Carlton || Johnson (4–4) || — || || 18,947 || 31–20 || L1
|-style=background:#cfc
| 52 || June 4 || || Astros || 3–2 || Moose (5–2) || Billingham || Giusti (11) || || 14,025 || 32–20 || W1
|-style=background:#fbb
| 53 || June 5 || || Astros || 1–4 || Dierker || Blass (5–3) || Gladding || || 23,793 || 32–21 || L1
|-style=background:#cfc
| 54 || June 6 || || Astros || 9–8 || Ellis (8–3) || Blasingame || Veale (2) || || 23,051 || 33–21 || W1
|-style=background:#cfc
| 55 || June 7 || || @ Cubs || 11–6 || Veale (2–0) || Pappas || Giusti (12) || || 16,478 || 34–21 || W2
|-style=background:#fbb
| 56 || June 8 || || @ Cubs || 0–1 (12) || Holtzman || Grant (3–2) || — || || 14,878 || 34–22 || L1
|-style=background:#fbb
| 57 || June 9 || || @ Cubs || 1–3 || Jenkins || Moose (5–3) || — || || 16,438 || 34–23 || L2
|-style=background:#cfc
| 58 || June 10 || || @ Cardinals || 3–1 || Blass (6–3) || Reuss || — || || 18,950 || 35–23 || W1
|-style=background:#cfc
| 59 || June 11 || || @ Cardinals || 11–4 || Ellis (9–3) || Cleveland || Giusti (13) || || 27,308 || 36–23 || W2
|-style=background:#cfc
| 60 || June 12 || || @ Cardinals || 4–3 || Grant (4–2) || Arroyo || — || || 24,565 || 37–23 || W3
|-style=background:#cfc
| 61 || June 13 || || @ Cardinals || 8–4 || Giusti (2–1) || Carlton || Hernández (1) || || 21,205 || 38–23 || W4
|-style=background:#fbb
| 62 || June 14 || || @ Astros || 4–5 || Gladding || Nelson (1–1) || — || || 11,655 || 38–24 || L1
|-style=background:#cfc
| 63 || June 15 || || @ Astros || 3–0 || Blass (7–3) || Dierker || — || || 16,307 || 39–24 || W1
|-style=background:#cfc
| 64 || June 16 || || @ Astros || 6–4 || Ellis (10–3) || Blasingame || — || || 16,098 || 40–24 || W2
|-style=background:#cfc
| 65 || June 18 || || Expos || 9–8 (11) || Giusti (3–1) || Raymond || — || || 26,644 || 41–24 || W3
|-style=background:#fbb
| 66 || June 19 || || Expos || 1–10 || Morton || Moose (5–4) || — || || 12,091 || 41–25 || L1
|-style=background:#cfc
| 67  || June 20 || || Expos || 7–1 || Blass (8–3) || Stoneman || — || ||  || 42–25 || W1
|-style=background:#cfc
| 68  || June 20 || || Expos || 7–3 || Briles (4–1) || Britton || Grant (5) || || 32,301 || 43–25 || W2
|-style=background:#cfc
| 69 || June 21 || 8:05p.m. EDT || Mets || 6–0 || Ellis (11–3) || Koosman (3–5) || — || 2:05 || 19,751 || 44–25 || W3
|-style=background:#fbb
| 70 || June 22 || 8:05p.m. EDT || Mets || 2–3 || Williams (3–1) || Nelson (1–2) || Frisella (7) || 2:29 || 27,578 || 44–26 || L1
|-style=background:#cfc
| 71 || June 23 || 8:05p.m. EDT || Mets || 6–2 || Walker (3–6) || Gentry (6–5) || Grant (6) || 2:28 || 31,225 || 45–26 || W1
|-style=background:#cfc
| 72 || June 25 || 7:35p.m. EDT || @ Phillies || 14–4 || Blass (9–3) || Bunning (5–9) || — || 2:27 || 38,736 || 46–26 || W2
|-style=background:#cfc
| 73 || June 26 || 2:15p.m. EDT || @ Phillies || 11–9 || Ellis (12–3) || Short (4–9) || Giusti (14) || 2:34 || 24,965 || 47–26 || W3
|-style=background:#fbb
| 74  || June 27 || 1:05p.m. EDT || @ Phillies || 4–8 || Fryman (2–3) || Johnson (4–5) || Hoerner (4) || 2:28 ||  || 47–27 || L1
|-style=background:#cfc
| 75  || June 27 || 4:08p.m. EDT || @ Phillies || 10–9 || Veale (3–0) || Hoerner (3–3) || Giusti (15) || 2:59 || 37,062 || 48–27 || W1
|-style=background:#cfc
| 76 || June 28 || || @ Cardinals || 11–5 || Moose (6–4) || Reuss || Grant (7) || || 15,024 || 49–27 || W2
|-style=background:#fbb
| 77 || June 29 || || @ Cardinals || 3–8 || Cleveland || Walker (3–7) || — || || 14,586 || 49–28 || L1
|-style=background:#fbb
| 78 || June 30 || 8:05p.m. EDT || @ Mets || 0–4 || Ryan (8–4) || Blass (9–4) || Frisella (8) || 2:08 || 50,399 || 49–29 || L2
|-

|-style=background:#cfc
| 79 || July 1 || 2:05p.m. EDT || @ Mets || 3–0 || Ellis (13–3) || Koosman (4–6) || Giusti (16) || 3:03 || 26,650 || 50–29 || W1
|-style=background:#cfc
| 80 || July 2 || || @ Cubs || 5–1 || Moose (7–4) || Jenkins || — || || 28,919 || 51–29 || W2
|-style=background:#fbb
| 81 || July 3 || || @ Cubs || 1–3 || Pappas || Johnson (4–6) || — || || 31,422 || 51–30 || L1
|-style=background:#fbb
| 82 || July 4 || || @ Cubs || 7–9 || Regan || Giusti (3–2) || Newman || || 30,401 || 51–31 || L2
|-style=background:#cfc
| 83 || July 5 || || @ Cubs || 6–2 || Blass (10–4) || Holtzman || — || || 37,734 || 52–31 || W1
|-style=background:#cfc
| 84 || July 6 || || Reds || 5–2 || Ellis (14–3) || McGlothlin || Giusti (17) || || 23,321 || 53–31 || W2
|-style=background:#cfc
| 85 || July 7 || || Reds || 9–3 || Johnson (5–6) || Nolan || — || || 23,873 || 54–31 || W3
|-style=background:#cfc
| 86 || July 8 || || Reds || 7–1 || Kison (1–0) || Gullett || Giusti (18) || || 22,534 || 55–31 || W4
|-style=background:#cfc
| 87 || July 9 || 8:05p.m. EDT || Braves || 11–2 || Briles (5–1) || Nash (6–6) || — || 2:29 || 29,678 || 56–31 || W5
|-style=background:#cfc
| 88 || July 10 || 2:15p.m. EDT || Braves || 5–4 || Grant (5–2) || Niekro (9–8) || Giusti (19) || 2:15 || 18,955 || 57–31 || W6
|-style=background:#bbb
|–|| July 11 || || Braves || colspan=8 | Postponed (Rain; Site change) (Makeup date: August 23)
|- style="text-align:center; background:#bbcaff;"
| colspan="12" | 42nd All-Star Game in Detroit, Michigan
|-style=background:#cfc
| 89 || July 15 || || Padres || 4–3 (17) || Nelson (2–2) || Coombs || — || || 17,405 || 58–31 || W7
|-style=background:#cfc
| 90 || July 16 || || Padres || 2–1 || Johnson (6–6) || Arlin || — || || 33,736 || 59–31 || W8
|-style=background:#cfc
| 91 || July 17 || || Padres || 9–2 || Ellis (15–3) || Norman || — || || 14,278 || 60–31 || W9
|-style=background:#cfc
| 92  || July 18 || || Dodgers || 3–2 || Giusti (4–2) || Downing || — || ||  || 61–31 || W10
|-style=background:#cfc
| 93  || July 18 || || Dodgers || 7–1 || Walker (4–7) || Singer || — || || 48,230 || 62–31 || W11
|-style=background:#fbb
| 94 || July 19 || || Dodgers || 4–10 || Osteen || Briles (5–2) || — || || 17,437 || 62–32 || L1
|-style=background:#cfc
| 95 || July 20 || 8:05p.m. EDT || Giants || 11–7 || Veale (4–0) || Carrithers (1–1) || Giusti (20) || 3:13 || 29,865 || 63–32 || W1
|-style=background:#fbb
| 96 || July 21 || 8:05p.m. EDT || Giants || 4–8 || Johnson (10–4) || Giusti (4–3) || Hamilton (3) || 2:46 || 35,145 || 63–33 || L1
|-style=background:#fbb
| 97 || July 22 || 12:35p.m. EDT || Giants || 7–8 (10) || Johnson (11–4) || Moose (7–5) || — || 3:18 || 33,185 || 63–34 || L2
|-style=background:#cfc
| 98 || July 23 || || @ Padres || 4–0 || Kison (2–0) || Kirby || — || || 10,133 || 64–34 || W1
|-style=background:#cfc
| 99 || July 24 || || @ Padres || 4–3 || Blass (11–4) || Roberts || Giusti (21) || || 3,114 || 65–34 || W2
|-style=background:#fbb
| 100  || July 25 || || @ Padres || 1–2 || Norman || Johnson (6–7) || — || ||  || 65–35 || L1
|-style=background:#fbb
| 101  || July 25 || || @ Padres || 0–2 || Arlin || Moose (7–6) || — || || 10,342 || 65–36 || L2
|-style=background:#fbb
| 102 || July 27 || || @ Dodgers || 5–8 || Alexander || Ellis (15–4) || Mikkelsen || || 26,564 || 65–37 || L3
|-style=background:#cfc
| 103 || July 28 || || @ Dodgers || 4–0 || Walker (5–7) || Singer || — || || 30,798 || 66–37 || W1
|-style=background:#cfc
| 104 || July 29 || || @ Dodgers || 8–5 || Veale (5–0) || Osteen || Giusti (22) || || 23,590 || 67–37 || W2
|-style=background:#fbb
| 105 || July 30 || 11:00p.m. EDT || @ Giants || 2–5 || Perry (10–8) || Kison (2–1) || — || 2:13 || 10,088 || 67–38 || L1
|-style=background:#fbb
| 106 || July 31 || 4:00p.m. EDT || @ Giants || 11–15 || McMahon (9–3) || Giusti (4–4) || Hamilton (4) || 3:15 || 18,834 || 67–39 || L2
|-

|-style=background:#fbb
| 107  || August 1 || 3:00p.m. EDT || @ Giants || 7–11 || Johnson (12–4) || Kison (2–2) || McMahon (4) || 2:28 ||  || 67–40 || L3
|-style=background:#fbb
| 108  || August 1 || 6:03p.m. EDT || @ Giants || 3–8 || Reberger (3–0) || Ellis (15–5) || Carrithers (1) || 2:31 || 33,301 || 67–41 || L4
|-style=background:#cfc
| 109 || August 3 || || @ Expos || 10–6 || Veale (6–0) || Morton || Giusti (23) || || 18,137 || 68–41 || W1
|-style=background:#fbb
| 110 || August 4 || || @ Expos || 3–4 (11) || Marshall || Grant (5–3) || — || || 17,481 || 68–42 || L1
|-style=background:#cfc
| 111 || August 5 || || @ Expos || 7–2 || Kison (3–2) || Strohmayer || — || || 21,233 || 69–42 || W1
|-style=background:#fbb
| 112 || August 6 || 8:05p.m. EDT || Phillies || 2–3 || Wilson (3–3) || Ellis (15–6) || — || 2:34 || 21,323 || 69–43 || L1
|-style=background:#fbb
| 113 || August 7 || 2:15p.m. EDT || Phillies || 3–5 || Wise (11–9) || Moose (7–7) || Wilson (3) || 2:36 || 29,565 || 69–44 || L2
|-style=background:#fbb
| 114  || August 8 || 1:05p.m. EDT || Phillies || 2–3 || Fryman (8–4) || Blass (11–5) || Hoerner (8) || 2:22 ||  || 69–45 || L3
|-style=background:#cfc
| 115  || August 8 || 4:02p.m. EDT || Phillies || 4–0 || Johnson (7–7) || Short (7–13) || — || 2:11 || 31,448 || 70–45 || W1
|-style=background:#fbb
| 116 || August 10 || || Cubs || 1–2 || Pizarro || Kison (3–3) || — || || 21,789 || 70–46 || L1
|-style=background:#cfc
| 117 || August 11 || || Cubs || 3–2 || Ellis (16–6) || Regan || — || || 24,147 || 71–46 || W1
|-style=background:#fbb
| 118 || August 12 || || Cardinals || 2–3 || Carlton || Walker (5–8) || — || || 21,805 || 71–47 || L1
|-style=background:#fbb
| 119 || August 13 || || Cardinals || 0–2 || Reuss || Blass (11–6) || — || || 31,563 || 71–48 || L2
|-style=background:#fbb
| 120 || August 14 || || Cardinals || 0–11 || Gibson || Johnson (7–8) || — || || 30,678 || 71–49 || L3
|-style=background:#fbb
| 121 || August 15 || || Cardinals || 4–6 || Linzy || Miller (0–1) || Drabowsky || || 49,329 || 71–50 || L4
|-style=background:#cfc
| 122 || August 16 || || Astros || 8–3 || Ellis (17–6) || Billingham || Giusti (24) || || 12,664 || 72–50 || W1
|-style=background:#fbb
| 123 || August 17 || || Astros || 5–6 || Blasingame || Miller (0–2) || Ray || || 16,694 || 72–51 || L1
|-style=background:#cfc
| 124 || August 18 || || Astros || 3–2 || Miller (1–2) || Lemaster || — || || 29,670 || 73–51 || W1
|-style=background:#cfc
| 125 || August 19 || || @ Reds || 5–1 || Johnson (8–8) || McGlothlin || — || || 20,611 || 74–51 || W2
|-style=background:#fbb
| 126 || August 20 || || @ Reds || 0–6 || Grimsley || Kison (3–4) || — || || 26,452 || 74–52 || L1
|-style=background:#fbb
| 127 || August 21 || || @ Reds || 3–6 || Merritt || Ellis (17–7) || — || || 27,427 || 74–53 || L2
|-style=background:#fbb
| 128 || August 22 || || @ Reds || 3–6 || Nolan || Briles (5–3) || — || || 31,431 || 74–54 || L3
|-style=background:#cfc
| 129  || August 23 || 6:05p.m. EDT || @ Braves || 4–3 || Blass (12–6) || Niekro (12–11) || Giusti (25) || 2:08 ||  || 75–54 || W1
|-style=background:#cfc
| 130  || August 23 || 8:48p.m. EDT || @ Braves || 15–4 || Moose (8–7) || Kelley (7–5) || Briles (1) || 2:34 || 16,163 || 76–54 || W2
|-style=background:#fbb
| 131 || August 24 || 8:05p.m. EST || @ Braves || 5–15 || McQueen (4–1) || Johnson (8–9) || Upshaw (16) || 2:24 || 8,478 || 76–55 || L1
|-style=background:#cfc
| 132 || August 25 || 8:05p.m. EST || @ Braves || 13–6 || Moose (9–7) || Jarvis (5–12) || Miller (1) || 2:41 || 8,365 || 77–55 || W1
|-style=background:#cfc
| 133 || August 27 || || @ Astros || 7–3 || Ellis (18–7) || Billingham || Giusti (26) || || 14,933 || 78–55 || W2
|-style=background:#fbb
| 134 || August 28 || || @ Astros || 0–4 || Wilson || Blass (12–7) || — || || 25,619 || 78–56 || L1
|-style=background:#cfc
| 135 || August 29 || || @ Astros || 5–2 || Johnson (9–9) || Blasingame || Giusti (27) || || 15,723 || 79–56 || W1
|-style=background:#cfc
| 136 || August 30 || 8:05p.m. EDT || Phillies || 6–4 || Walker (6–8) || Wilson (3–5) || Giusti (28) || 3:04 || 13,399 || 80–56 || W2
|-style=background:#cfc
| 137 || August 31 || 8:05p.m. EDT || Phillies || 7–5 || Kison (4–4) || Hoerner (4–4) || Miller (2) || 2:34 || 16,179 || 81–56 || W3
|-

|-style=background:#cfc
| 138 || September 1 || 8:05p.m. EDT || Phillies || 10–7 || Walker (7–8) || Brandon (6–6) || — || 2:44 || 11,278 || 82–56 || W4
|- bgcolor="ffbbbb"
| 139 || September 3 || || Expos || 4–6 || Britton || Giusti (4–5) || Marshall || || 17,951 || 82–57 || L1
|-style=background:#cfc
| 140 || September 4 || || Expos || 7–6 (11) || Giusti (5–5) || Marshall || — || || 11,302 || 83–57 || W1
|-style=background:#cfc
| 141 || September 5 || || Expos || 8–2 || Kison (5–4) || Stoneman || Hernández (2) || || 15,897 || 84–57 || W2
|-style=background:#cfc
| 142  || September 6 || || Cubs || 4–1 || Briles (6–3) || Pizarro || — || || 39,236 || 85–57 || W3
|-style=background:#cfc
| 143  || September 6 || || Cubs || 10–5 || Walker (8–8) || Holtzman || Moose (1) || || 39,236 || 86–57 || W4
|-style=background:#cfc
| 144 || September 8 || || Cubs || 10–1 || Blass (13–7) || Pappas || — || || 15,937 || 87–57 || W5
|-style=background:#fbb
| 145 || September 10 || || @ Expos || 2–3 (11) || Strohmayer || Giusti (5–6) || — || || 21,529 || 87–58 || L1
|-style=background:#fbb
| 146 || September 11 || || @ Expos || 1–4 || McAnally || Kison (5–5) || — || || 18,376 || 87–59 || L2
|-style=background:#cfc
| 147 || September 12 || || @ Expos || 4–0 || Briles (7–3) || Renko || — || || 16,770 || 88–59 || W1
|-style=background:#cfc
| 148 || September 13 || || @ Cubs || 5–1 || Blass (14–7) || Pappas || — || || 6,477 || 89–59 || W2
|-style=background:#cfc
| 149 || September 14 || || @ Cubs || 4–3 || Moose (10–7) || Jenkins || — || || 9,706 || 90–59 || W3
|-style=background:#cfc
| 150 || September 15 || || Cardinals || 4–1 || Ellis (19–7) || Carlton || Hernández (3) || || 21,751 || 91–59 || W4
|-style=background:#cfc
| 151 || September 16 || || Cardinals || 6–1 || Walker (9–8) || Reuss || Hernández (4) || || 18,127 || 92–59 || W5
|-style=background:#fbb
| 152 || September 17 || 8:05p.m. EDT || Mets || 0–3 || Gentry (12–10) || Briles (7–4) || — || 1:59 || 23,421 || 92–60 || L1
|-style=background:#cfc
| 153 || September 18 || 2:15p.m. EDT || Mets || 4–0 || Blass (15–7) || Sadecki (7–7) || — || 1:42 || 20,470 || 93–60 || W1
|-style=background:#fbb
| 154 || September 19 || 1:35p.m. EDT || Mets || 2–5 || Williams (5–6) || Johnson (9–10) || Frisella (12) || 2:34 || 40,337 || 93–61 || L1
|-style=background:#fbb
| 155 || September 21 || || @ Cardinals || 4–6 || Drabowsky || Ellis (19–8) || — || || 13,348 || 93–62 || L2
|-style=background:#cfc
| 156 || September 22 || || @ Cardinals || 5–1 || Walker (10–8) || Gibson || Giusti (29) || || 14,845 || 94–62 || W1
|-style=background:#cfc
| 157 || September 23 || || @ Cardinals || 5–0 || Briles (8–4) || Cleveland || — || || 10,918 || 95–62 || W2
|-style=background:#cfc
| 158 || September 24 || 8:05p.m. EDT || @ Mets || 3–2 || Kison (6–5) || Koosman (6–11) || Miller (3) || 1:56 || 35,936 || 96–62 || W3
|-style=background:#fbb
| 159 || September 25 || 2:15p.m. EDT || @ Mets || 1–2 (15) || Frisella (8–5) || Hernández (0–1) || — || 3:50 || 29,295 || 96–63 || L1
|-style=background:#fbb
| 160 || September 26 || 2:05p.m. EDT || @ Mets || 1–3 || Seaver (19–10) || Blass (15–8) || — || 1:53 || 30,519 || 96–64 || L2
|-style=background:#fbb
| 161 || September 28 || 7:35p.m. EDT || @ Phillies || 3–6 || Wise (17–14) || Ellis (19–9) || — || 2:19 || 14,582 || 96–65 || L3
|-style=background:#cfc
| 162 || September 30 || 7:35p.m. EDT || @ Phillies || 4–3 || Moose (11–7) || Champion (3–5) || Giusti (30) || 2:12 || 14,157 || 97–65 || W1
|-

|- style="text-align:center;"
| Legend:       = Win       = Loss       = PostponementBold = Pirates team member

Composite Box

Notable transactions 
 June 8, 1971: Craig Reynolds chosen by the Pirates in the 1st round of the 1971 Major League Baseball draft.
 August 10, 1971: Bob Miller was traded to the Pirates by the San Diego Padres for Johnny Jeter and Ed Acosta.
 August 10, 1971: Mudcat Grant was sold by the Pirates to the Oakland Athletics.

Roster

Opening Day lineup

Postseason

Postseason game log 

|-  style="background:#fbb;"
| 1 || October 2 || 4:00p.m. EDT || @ Giants || 4–5 || Perry (1–0) || Blass (0–1) || — || 2:44 || 40,977 || SF 1–0 || L1
|-style=background:#cfc
| 2 || October 3 || 4:00p.m. EDT || @ Giants || 9–4 || Ellis (1–0) || Cumberland (0–1) || — || 3:23 || 42,562 || Tied 1–1 || W1
|-style=background:#cfc
| 3 || October 5 || 1:30p.m. EDT || Giants || 2–1 || Johnson (1–0) || Marichal (0–1) || — || 2:26 || 38,222 || PIT 2–1 || W2
|-style=background:#cfc
| 4 || October 6 || 1:30p.m. EDT || Giants || 9–5 || Kison (1–0) || Perry (1–1) || — || 3:00 || 35,487 || PIT 3–1 || W3
|-

|-style=background:#fbb
| 1 || October 9 || 1:00p.m. EDT || @ Orioles || 3–5 || McNally (2–0) || Ellis (1–1) || — || 2:06 || 53,229 || BAL 1–0 || L1
|-style=background:#bbb
|–|| October 10 || || @ Orioles || colspan=6 | Postponed (Rain) (Makeup date: October 11) || BAL 1–0 ||
|-style=background:#fbb
| 2 || October 11 || 1:00p.m. EDT || @ Orioles || 3–11 || Palmer (2–0) || Johnson (1–1) || Hall (1) || 2:55 || 53,239 || BAL 2–0 || L2
|-style=background:#cfc
| 3 || October 12 || 1:00p.m. EDT || Orioles || 5–1 || Blass (1–1) || Cuellar (1–1) || — || 2:20 || 50,403 || BAL 2–1 || W1
|-style=background:#cfc
| 4 || October 13 || 8:15p.m. EDT || Orioles || 4–3 || Kison (2–0) || Watt (0–1) || Giusti (1) || 2:48 || 51,378 || Tied 2–2 || W2
|-style=background:#cfc
| 5 || October 14 || 1:00p.m. EDT || Orioles || 4–0 || Briles (1–0) || McNally (2–1) || — || 2:16 || 51,377 || PIT 3–2 || W3
|-style=background:#fbb
| 6 || October 16 || 1:00p.m. EDT || @ Orioles || 2–3 (10) || McNally (3–1) || Miller (0–1) || — || 2:59 || 44,174 || Tied 3–3 || L1
|-style=background:#cfc
| 7 || October 17 || 1:00p.m. EDT || @ Orioles || 2–1 || Blass (2–1) || Cuellar (1–2) || — || 2:10 || 47,291 || PIT 4–3 || W1
|-

|- style="text-align:center;"
| Legend:       = Win       = Loss       = PostponementBold = Pirates team member

National League Championship Series 

The Pittsburgh Pirates won the series over the San Francisco Giants, 3–1

World Series

Composite box 
1971 World Series (4–3): Pittsburgh Pirates (N.L.) over Baltimore Orioles (A.L.)

Player stats

Batting

Starters by position 
Note: Pos = Position; G = Games played; AB = At bats; R = Runs scored; H = Hits; Avg. = Batting average; HR = Home runs; RBI = Runs batted in; SB = Stolen bases

Other batters 
Note: G = Games played; AB = At bats; R = Runs scored; H = Hits; Avg. = Batting average; HR = Home runs; RBI = Runs batted in; SB = Stolen bases

Pitching

Starting pitchers 
Note: G = Games pitched; IP = Innings pitched; W = Wins; L = Losses; ERA = Earned run average; BB = Walks allowed; SO = Strikeouts

Other pitchers 
Note: G = Games pitched; IP = Innings pitched; W = Wins; L = Losses; ERA = Earned run average; BB = Walks allowed; SO = Strikeouts

Relief pitchers 
Note: G = Games pitched; IP = Innings pitched; W = Wins; L = Losses; SV = Saves; ERA = Earned run average; BB = Walks allowed; SO = Strikeouts

Awards and honors 
 Roberto Clemente, Babe Ruth Award
 Roberto Clemente, World Series Most Valuable Player Award
 Roberto Clemente, Gold Glove Award

League leaders 
 Willie Stargell, National League home run champion (48)
 Dave Giusti, Saves leader (30)

All-Stars 
1971 Major League Baseball All-Star Game
 Dock Ellis, pitcher, starter
 Willie Stargell, outfield, starter
 Roberto Clemente, reserve
 Vic Davalillo, reserve
 Manny Sanguillén, reserve

Farm system

Notes

Sources

References

Further reading

External links
 1971 Pittsburgh Pirates at Baseball Reference
 1971 Pittsburgh Pirates at Baseball Almanac

Pittsburgh Pirates seasons
Pittsburgh Pirates season
National League East champion seasons
National League champion seasons
World Series champion seasons
Pittsburg